Kontroll is a 2003 Hungarian comedy–thriller film. Shown internationally, mainly in art house theatres, the film is set on a fictionalized version of the Budapest Metro system.  "Kontroll" in Hungarian refers to the act of ticket inspectors checking to ensure a rider has paid their fare. The story revolves around the ticket inspectors, riders, and a possible killer.

The film was written and directed by Nimród Antal and stars Sándor Csányi, Zoltán Mucsi, and Csaba Pindroch.  The film was entered in a number of film festivals in Europe and North America.  It won the Gold Hugo Award at the Chicago International Film Festival and was screened in the Un Certain Regard section at the 2004 Cannes Film Festival.  It was also Hungary's submission for Best Foreign Language Film for the 2004 Academy Awards.

Plot
Bulcsú (Sándor Csányi) is a ticket inspector on the underground; he spends his nights sleeping on the train platforms, and hasn't left the underground ever since he started working there. His ragtag team of inspectors – consisting of the veteran Professzor (Zoltán Mucsi), the disheveled Lecsó (Sándor Badár), neurotic narcoleptic Muki (Csaba Pindroch) and dimwitted greenhorn Tibi (Zsolt Nagy) – is routinely disrespected and assaulted by the commuters, who continue to evade paying fines in a variety of ways.

One of Bulcsú's company rivals, model employee Gonzó (Balázs Mihályfi) challenges him to a "rail run": after the last metro leaves a station, the two get on the tracks and try to make it to the next station on foot before the midnight maintenance carriage runs them over. Bulcsú wins the contest, barely saving Gonzó who wets himself as a result of the run. During a routine inspection, he is enamored by a girl dressed in a bear suit called Zsófi (Eszter Balla), the daughter of one of the veteran metro drivers, Béla (Lajos Kovács). In another occasion, Bulcsú unsuccessfully attempts to talk to his colleague Laci (László Nádasi) after Laci gets into an altercation with a passenger and takes him hostage; Laci exclaims he can't take it anymore and slits the passenger's throat.

After chasing a repeat offending prankster called Bootsie (Gyalogkakukk, lit. Road Runner in the Hungarian original; Bence Mátyássy), Bulcsú witnesses him being pushed on the tracks by a hooded figure, dressed in exactly the same attire as him; another incident in a long line of what people thought were apparent suicides. Because of his recurring nightmare of this figure, Bulcsú fails to apprehend the murderer, and when he's brought to questioning, he refuses to disclose details of the incident to the lead executive (György Cserhalmi) of the company. When the executive threatens to disclose the video footage of the incident, which only shows Bulcsú, he resigns his job. Muki later insinuates him being the murderer, citing his continual nightly absence and accusing him of having the same mental issues as Laci did; an infuriated Bulcsú almost pushes him on the tracks as well.

During an underground costume party, Bulcsú spots and follows the hooded figure and they get into an altercation, after which they start rail running similarly to the contest with Gonzó earlier. Bulcsú manages to outrun the hooded figure and escape the train. The hooded figure never emerges from the tracks. Bulcsú then meets Zsófi, who is now dressed as a angel, and the two finally emerge back to the surface.

Cast
 Sándor Csányi as Bulcsú
 Zoltán Mucsi as Professor
 Csaba Pindroch as Muki
 Sándor Badár as Lecsó
 as Tibi
 Bence Mátyássy as Bootsie
 Győző Szabó as Shadow
 Eszter Balla as Zsófi
 Lajos Kovács as Béla
 Enikő Eszenyi as drunk woman on the escalator

Production
Antal was influenced by Andrei Tarkovsky, Stanley Kubrick, Terry Gilliam, Martin Scorsese, and Takeshi Kitano.

Reception
Rotten Tomatoes, a review aggregator, reports that 82% of  66 surveyed critics gave the film a positive review; the average rating is 7/10.  The site's consensus reads: "Kontroll is a smart thriller that's dark, gritty, and funny."  Metacritic rated it 72/100 based on 25 critics.  American film critic Roger Ebert rated it 3.5/4 stars and wrote, "Antal has a feeling for action, but what distinguishes Kontroll is his control of characters and mood."  Ebert compared the film's setting and atmosphere to that of a post-apocalyptic science fiction film.

See also
 List of Hungarian submissions for the Academy Award for Best Foreign Language Film

References

External links
 
 
 
 
 
 Kontroll at the Boston Film Festival
 Kontroll at the Minneapolis–Saint Paul International Film Festival

2003 films
2000s comedy thriller films
2003 psychological thriller films
2000s Hungarian-language films
Hungarian comedy thriller films
Hungarian satirical films
Budapest Metro
Films set in Budapest
Films shot in Budapest
Rail transport films
Films directed by Nimród Antal
2003 directorial debut films
2003 comedy films